El Salvador sent a delegation to compete at the 2008 Summer Paralympics in Beijing, People's Republic of China. The delegation consisted of a single competitor, runner Zulma Cruz.

Athletics

See also
El Salvador at the Paralympics
El Salvador at the 2008 Summer Olympics

External links
 
Beijing 2008 Paralympic Games Official Site

Nations at the 2008 Summer Paralympics
2008
Summer Paralympics